Sakas are described in Sanskrit sources as a Mleccha tribe grouped along with the Yavanas, Tusharas and Barbaras. There were a group of Sakas called Apa Sakas meaning water dwelling Sakas, probably living around some lake in central Asian steppes. Sakas took part in Kurukshetra War.

References in Mahabharata

The region called Sakadwipa

Mahabharata mentions about a whole region inhabited by Sakas called Sakadwipa to the north-west of ancient India. There in that region are, many delightful provinces where Siva is worshipped, and thither repair the Siddhas, the Charanas, and the Devas. The people there are virtuous, and all the four orders are devoted to their respective occupations. No instance of theft can be seen there. Freed from decrepitude and death and gifted with long life, the people there grow like rivers during the season of rains. The rivers there are full of sacred water, and Ganga herself, distributed as she hath been into various currents, is there as Sukumari, and Kumari, and Seta, and Keveraka, and Mahanadi and the river Manijala, and Chakshus, and the river Vardhanika, these and many other rivers by thousands and hundreds, all full of sacred water, are there. It is impossible to recount the names and lengths of rivers. As heard by all men there, in that region of Saka, are four sacred provinces. They are the Mrigas, the Masakas, the Manasas, and the Mandagas.

The Mrigas for the most part are Brahmanas devoted to the occupations of their order. Amongst the Masakas are virtuous Kshatriyas. The Manasas live by following the duties of the Vaishya order. Having every wish of theirs gratified, they are also brave and firmly devoted to virtue and profit. The Mandagas are all brave Shudras of virtuous behaviour.

In these provinces, there is no king, no punishment, no person that deserves to be punished. Conversant with the dictates of duty they are all engaged in the practice of their respective duties and protect one another. This much is capable of being said of the region called Saka.

The region called Sakadwipa is mentioned again at (12:14) as a region to the east of the great Karnali mountains.

The tale of Kamadhenu's army 

When the sage Vasistha was attacked by king Viswamitra's army, Vasistha's cow, Kamadehnu, brought forth from her tail, an army of Palhavas, and from her udders, an army of Dravidas and Sakas; and from her womb, an army of Yavanas, and from her dung, an army of Savaras; and from her urine, an army of Kanchis; and from her sides, an army of Savaras. And from the froth of her mouth came out hosts of Paundras and Kiratas, Yavanas and Sinhalas, and the barbarous tribes of Khasas and Chivukas and Pulindas and Chinas and Hunas with Keralas, and numerous other Mlechchhas.

In the ancient Indian literature, cow is a symbol of earth or land.  Thus the myth mentioned above simply means that, these tribes gathered for the protection of sage Vasistha's land against the army of king Viswamitra.  This myth indicates that the ancient people were familiar with these Mlechcha tribes who were highly skilled in weapons, warfare and material sciences but never followed the Vedic rites properly.

The confusion of ancient Vedic people in dealing with these tribes is evident in the following passage from Mahabharata. At (12:35) is mentioned:- What duties should be performed by the Yavanas, the Kiratas, the Gandharvas, the Chinas, the Savaras, the Barbaras, the  Sakas, the Tusharas, the Kankas, the Pathavas, the Andhras, the Madrakas, the Paundras, the Pulindas, the Ramathas, the Kamvojas, the several castes that have sprung up from Brahmanas and Kshatriyas, the Vaishyas, and the Shudras, that reside in the dominions of (Arya) kings?.

They were later given the status of Shudras.  It is in consequence of the absence of Brahmanas from among them that the  Sakas, the Yavanas, the Kamvojas and other Kshatriya tribes have become fallen and degraded into the status of Shudras.  The Dravidas, the Kalingas, the Pulandas, the Usinaras, the Kolisarpas, the Mahishakas and other Kshatriyas, have, in consequence of the absence of Brahmanas from among their midst, become degraded into Shudras (13:33).

Encounters with the Sakas 
Nakula the son of Pandu reduced to subjection the fierce Mlechchas residing on the sea coast, as also the wild tribes of the Palhavas, the Kiratas, the Yavanas, and the  Sakas (2:31).

They were also vanquished by Krishna:- The  Sakas, and the Yavanas with followers, were all vanquished by Krishna. (7:11).

Bhima subjugated strategically the Sakas and the barbarians living in that part of the country. And the son of Pandu, sending forth expeditions from Videha, conquered the seven kings of the Kiratas living about the Indra mountain.  (2:29). These Sakas seems to be established in the north-east regions of Gangatic plain. These Sakas close to Videha was mentioned at (6:9) in the list of kingdoms of Bharata Varsha (Ancient India). Another colony of Sakas were mentioned close to the Nishadha Kingdom in central India.

Tribute to Yudhishthira 

Sakas were mentioned with other tribes, bringing tribute to Yudhishthira (2:50,51). Numberless Chinas and Sakas and Uddras and many barbarous tribes living in the woods, and many Vrishnis and Harahunas, and dusky tribes of the Himavat, and many Nipas and people residing in regions on the sea-coast, waited at the gate.

In Kurukshetra War 

Words of Satyaki a commander in the side of Pandavas:- I shall have to encounter the Sakas endued with prowess equal to that of Sakra (Indra) himself, who are fierce as tire, and difficult to put out like a blazing conflagration (7:109).

In Kurukshetra War, the Sakas sided with the Kauravas under the Kamboja king Sudakshina.

Saka king was reckoned by Drupada in his list of kings to be summoned for the cause of Pandavas in Kurukshetra War (5:4). Sudakshina, the king of the Kambhojas, accompanied by the Yavanas and  Sakas, came to the Kuru chief with an Akshauhini of troops (5:19). The  Sakas, the Kiratas, and Yavanas, the Sivis and the Vasatis with their Maharathas at the heads of their respective divisions joined the Kaurava army (5:198). The  Sakas, the Kiratas, and Yavanas, and the Pahlavas, took up his position at the northern point of the army (6:20).

Of terrible deeds and exceedingly fierce, the Tusharas, the Yavanas, the Khasas, the Darvabhisaras, the Daradas, the  Sakas, the Kamathas, the Ramathas, the Tanganas the Andhrakas, the Pulindas, the Kiratas of fierce prowess, the Mlecchas, the Parvatas, and the races hailing from the sea-side, all endued with great wrath and great might, delighting in battle and armed with maces, these all united with the Kurus (8:73).

Yavanas were armed with bow and arrows and skilled in smiting. They were followed by  Sakas and Daradas and Barbaras and Tamraliptakas, and other countless Mlecchas (7:116). Three thousand bowmen headed by Duryodhana, with a number of  Sakas  and Kamvojas and Valhikas and Yavanas and Paradas, and Kalingas and Tanganas and Amvashtas and Pisachas and Barbaras and Parvatas, inflamed with rage and armed with stone, all rushed against Satyaki (7:118).

Sakas were mentioned along with other tribes like the Sudras, the Abhiras, the Daserakas, the Yavanas, the Kamvojas, the Hangsapadas, the Paradas, the Vahlikas, the Samsthanas, the Surasenas, the Venikas, the Kukkuras, the Rechakas, the Trigartas, the Madrakas, the Tusharas and the Chulikas as battling on the side of Kauravas at various passages. (6:51,75,88, 7:20,90).

A number of  Saka and Tukhara and Yavana horsemen, accompanied by some of the foremost combatants among the Kambojas, quickly rushed against Arjuna (8:88). All the Samsaptakas, the Kambojas together with the  Sakas, the Mlecchas, the Parvatas, and the Yavanas, have also been slain by Arjuna (9:1)

Sakas after Kurukshetra War 

A passage which is rendered as a futuristic prediction in Mahabharata mentions thus:- The Sakas, the Pulindas, the Yavanas, the Kamvojas, the Valhikas and the Abhiras, will then become possessed of bravery and the sovereignty of the whole earth (3:187).

See also 
Kingdoms of Ancient India

References 
Mahabharata of Krishna Dwaipayana Vyasa, translated to English by Kisari Mohan Ganguli

External links

Kingdoms in the Mahabharata
Indo-Scythian peoples
Mahabharata